Out of Africa Wildlife Park is a wildlife park and zoo in Camp Verde, Arizona. It was opened to the public in 2005.

Dean Harrison is the owner.

Gallery

References

External links
 

Zoos in Arizona